The Oulu child murders is a Finnish murder case, referring to the discovery of the bodies of five infants in the basement  of an apartment building in Oulu, on June 3, 2014. The mother of the babies, 35-year-old Kaisa Emilia Vornanen-Karaduman, had concealed the pregnancies and abandoned them, after giving birth at home. The Rovaniemi Court of Appeal sentenced her to 13 years imprisonment for five counts of manslaughter, but not for concealing a corpse. According to District Prosecutor Sari Kemppainen, who was the lead prosecutor for the case, there have been no similar cases in Finnish criminal history.

Discovery 
On June 3, 2014, Oulu police received a complaint about some foul-smelling packages found in the basement storage of an apartment block in the center. When examined, the packages were found to contain the bodies of five infants.

The 35-year-old mother of these children, Kaisa Emilia Vornanen-Karaduman (b. 1979), was arrested and detained on suspicion of manslaughter and concealment of a corpse. During interrogation, the charges were increased to five homicides. The woman claimed that she had given birth at home, and preserved the bodies after death in a freezer. She could not explain the motive for her actions, and denied deliberately killing them. As the latest apartment did not have a freezer, the bodies had been put in a basement storage.

The preliminary investigation determined that the children were born in the years 2005, 2007, at the turn of the year 2011–2012, 2012 and 2013. They were born in apartments on Rommakkokatu and Peltokatu streets. The causes of death could not be determined, because the bodies had been severely degraded by then. According to the prosecutor later at trial, Vornanen-Karaduman had usually given birth in the bathroom or toilet, wrapped the babies up in plastic bags, put them in a bucket, closed it and then took it to the basement. In two instances, she claimed to have used a sauna bucket and a shoe box instead of a normal bucket. According to the prosecutor, the woman had left the children without any care or assistance after they were born.

During the examinations, 28 people were interviewed as witnesses, including relatives, colleagues and acquaintances. Vornanen-Karaduman had hidden her pregnancies from the others, with loose clothing. Her relatives knew about one pregnancy, that the woman claimed had ended in a miscarriage. A former boss of Vornanen-Karaduman suspected that she was pregnant at one time, but she had explained to her manager that her stomach was rounded as a result of all the greasy pizzas that she had eaten the previous night. Vornanen-Karadumanen's father described his daughter as a pathological liar.

Vornanen-Karaduman's lawyer stated in his final statement in the district court hearing that his client was pregnant, yet again, during the summer of 2014, when she was arrested by police. This pregnancy, however, was terminated at her own request.

Trial and imprisonment 
The Oulu District Court handled the case in a matter of four days in December 2014. Vornanen-Karaduman was charged with five murders and five counts of concealing a corpse. She denied all charges, and insisted on her innocence. However, if found guilty, she claimed that it would at most be negligent homicide or aggravated death. Vornanen-Karaduman said that for every baby she gave birth to, she felt lifeless, because they did not move or cry. According to her, it was only later did she learn that the babies had been alive.

The district court found that Vornanen-Karaduman acted deliberately in the deaths of her babies, and she was ordered to undergo a psychiatric assessment. The results were revealed on June 1, 2015, and Vornanen-Karaduman was concluded to be criminally responsible for the acts, though she had a mixed personality disorder.

On June 15, the District Court sentenced Kaisa Vornanen-Karaduman to life imprisonment for five murders and five counts of concealing a corpse. According to the law, the repetition of the acts almost identically, in five separate instances, showed that the acts had been planned out.

In June 2016, the Rovaniemi Court of Appeal reduced Vornanen-Karaduman's sentence to 13 years imprisonment for five counts of manslaughter.

References 

2005 murders in Finland 
2007 murders in Finland 
2011 murders in Finland 
2012 murders in Finland 
2013 murders in Finland
2014 in Finland 
2000s murders in Finland 
2010s murders in Finland
2010s trials
Filicides
History of Oulu
Infanticide
June 2014 crimes in Europe
June 2014 events in Europe
Murdered Finnish children
People with personality disorders
Serial murders in Finland
Violence against children